Marko Mihajlović (born 20 August 1987) is a Bosnia and Herzegovina professional footballer who plays as a defender for Serbian First League club Sloga Kraljevo.

Career
Mihajlović signed for Georgian club Dinamo Batumi ahead of the second half of the 2015–16 season. In 2016, he signed for Al-Ramtha in Jordan, then moved to Salam Zgharta in the Lebanese Premier League one season later.

In 2020, Mihajlović signed for Serbian club Sloga Kraljevo. He debuted on 22 August 2020, in a 2–0 home defeat to Kabel. On 24 October 2020, Mihajlović scored his first goal in a 1–1 draw against Železničar Pančevo.

References

External links
 
 
 
 
 

1987 births
Living people
People from Foča
Bosnia and Herzegovina footballers
Association football defenders
RFK Novi Sad 1921 players
Dalkurd FF players
Umeå FC players
IK Brage players
Hammarby Fotboll players
Syrianska FC players
FC Dinamo Batumi players
Al-Ramtha SC players
Salam Zgharta FC players
FK Sloga Kraljevo players
Ettan Fotboll players
Superettan players
Erovnuli Liga players
Jordanian Pro League players
Lebanese Premier League players
Serbian First League players
Bosnia and Herzegovina expatriate footballers
Bosnia and Herzegovina expatriate sportspeople in Sweden
Bosnia and Herzegovina expatriate sportspeople in Georgia (country)
Bosnia and Herzegovina expatriate sportspeople in Jordan
Bosnia and Herzegovina expatriate sportspeople in Lebanon
Bosnia and Herzegovina expatriate sportspeople in Serbia
Expatriate footballers in Sweden
Expatriate footballers in Georgia (country)
Expatriate footballers in Jordan
Expatriate footballers in Lebanon
Expatriate footballers in Serbia